"Arma-goddamn-motherfuckin-geddon" is a song by American rock band Marilyn Manson. It was released as the second single from their seventh studio album The High End of Low. It has been remixed by the Teddybears. The song was released for download on May 5, 2009, along with the pre-order of The High End of Low. The song was included in the game Saints Row: The Third on one of the in-vehicle radio stations.

Reception
Metal Hammer describes "Arma-goddamn-motherfuckin-geddon" as having "Heavy basslines, a stomping back-beat and a very traditionally Manson glam-chorus are the order of the day. It's this glam rock tinge that really shines through on the track, nodding to his penchant for decadent [1970s] rock but with an old school Manson industrial shade [...] He may not be as dangerous as he once appeared but it is good to hear Mazza using one of those many middle fingers he was born with once again."

Thrash Hits gave the song a positive review, saying "‘Arma-goddamn-motherfucking-geddon’ rides Ramirez’s rubbery honk of a bassline into a fist-pumping, glam-stomp of a chorus," and included it as one of the top tracks of the album.

Music video

Concept and filming

On April 3, Polydor Records alluded to the previously unconfirmed music video for "Arma-goddamn-motherfuckin-geddon," saying it would be available no earlier than April 17. On April 6, behind-the-scenes video clips and photos of the song's music video, directed by Delaney Bishop, were released.

In one scene, Manson stands at a podium similar to the one used during live performances of "Antichrist Superstar", however rather than the podium bearing the era's shock logo, a slightly different logo containing a dollar symbol appears instead. Several of these logos are also hung from the backdrop behind Manson. Another scene involves Manson standing on the hood of a police cruiser singing, while he is crowded by bystanders holding picket signs.

Manson has revealed that the music video was filmed using "30 or 40 cameras," but only two of these cameras make up the footage seen in the final video. Manson went on to tell that he is interested in releasing "the 30-camera angle version" as well. Manson also claimed that the song was inspired by an instance where he was driving to the studio and witnessed a 'ruckus' with the police, and that it has a very intentional "Adam Ant/Gary Glitter throwback vibe."

Release
UK television station Channel 4 announced that they would premier the music video during the early hours of April 18, however this did not occur and the station later explained that "due to unforeseen circumstances, the video was not delivered to Channel 4 in time to screen it." They also reported that because other stations had been screening it, Channel 4 did not plan to air it in the future; curiously, this explanation is false. Universal Music later reported that the music video was expected to premier around May 5, however this date was not met either. On May 14 however, the music video, in which Manson and bassist Twiggy Ramirez, Chris Vrenna and Ginger Fish appear, debuted on NME.com in censored form, before appearing on the band's official website in uncensored form hours later.

Formats and track listings
All lyrics by Marilyn Manson; all music by Twiggy and Chris Vrenna.

 UK CD single 
 "Arma-goddamn-motherfuckin-geddon"  – 3:39
 "Arma-goddamn-motherfuckin-geddon"  – 3:29

 EU CD single 
 "Arma-goddamn-motherfuckin-geddon"  – 3:39
 "Arma-goddamn-motherfuckin-geddon"  – 3:31
 "Arma-goddamn-motherfuckin-geddon"  – 3:40
 "Arma-goddamn-motherfuckin-geddon"  – 4:23

 EU 7-inch single 
 "Arma-goddamn-motherfuckin-geddon"  – 3:39
 "Arma-goddamn-motherfuckin-geddon"  – 3:43

 EU promo CD 
 "Arma-goddamn-motherfuckin-geddon"  – 3:39
 "Arma-goddamn-motherfuckin-geddon"  – 3:39
 "Arma-goddamn-motherfuckin-geddon"  – 3:29
 "Arma-goddamn-motherfuckin-geddon"  – 3:29

 French promo CD
 "Arma-goddamn-motherfuckin-geddon"  – 3:39
 "We're from America"  – 5:04

 US promo CD 
 "Arma... geddon"  – 3:38
 "Arma-goddamn-motherfuckin-geddon"  – 3:39
 "Arma... geddon"  – 3:29

 US promo 7-inch vinyl 
 "Arma-goddamn-motherfuckin-geddon"  – 3:39
 "Arma-goddamn-motherfuckin-geddon"  – 4:23

Credits and personnel
Credits adapted from the liner notes of The High End of Low and "Arma-goddamn-motherfuckin-geddon".

 Marilyn Manson – vocals and production
 Twiggy – guitars and production
 Chris Vrenna – keyboards, programming, production, engineering and mixing ; programming, production, engineering and mixing 
 Sean Beavan – production, engineering, mixing and mastering ; engineering 
 Joakim Åhlund – additional vocals 
 Patrik Arve – remixing 
 Rod Crawford – additional vocals 
 Shawn Crahan – production, engineering, remixing and mixing 
 Robert Orton – mixing 
 Matt Sepanic – engineering and mixing

Charts

References

Marilyn Manson (band) songs
2009 singles
Songs written by Marilyn Manson
Songs written by Jeordie White
Songs written by Chris Vrenna
2008 songs
Interscope Records singles
Gothic rock songs
Glam rock songs